Disney Stars and Motor Cars Parade was a parade at Disney's Hollywood Studios at Walt Disney World Resort, and Walt Disney Studios Park at Disneyland Paris. The parade first premiered on October 1, 2001, as part of the Walt Disney World Resort's 100 Years of Magic Celebration. The parade is a procession of characters riding in highly themed cars down the streets of Disney's Hollywood Studios  in true Hollywood style.

During the holiday season, the parade was transformed into the "Hollywood Holly-day Parade". The parade had its final run at Disney's Hollywood Studios on March 8, 2008. It has been replaced by the Block Party Bash parade from Disney California Adventure Park. Block Party Bash had its "soft opening" on March 9, 2008. It premiered on April 4, with previews for guests beginning on March 9.

Disney-MGM Studios/Disney Hollywood Studios

Regular cars
The regular features of the parade included the following cars. The parade route travelled from the gate next to Star Tours over to Hollywood Boulevard to next to the exit of the park. The parade originally consisted of 15 cars, but was later updated to 18 over time:

 Float 1: Toy Story - Jessie, Sheriff Woody, Buzz, Bo Peep and the Toy Soldiers
 Float 2: Mary Poppins - Mary Poppins, Bert and Penguins
 Float 3: The Muppets - Kermit the Frog, Miss Piggy and Sweetums
 Float 4: Star Wars - R2-D2, Princess Leia, Luke Skywalker and Darth Vader
 Float 5: Mulan - Mulan, Mushu and Chinese Warriors
 Float 6: Aladdin - Aladdin, Jasmine and Harem Girls
 Float 7: Hercules - Hercules, Megara, Philoctetes, Pain and Panic
 Float 8: Disney Villains - Hades, Cruella De Vil, Jafar, Evil Queen, Captain Hook and Frollo
 Float 9: Atlantis: The Lost Empire - Milo Thatch and Kida
 Float 10: The Little Mermaid - Ariel and Fishes
 Float 11: Playhouse Disney - JoJo, Goliath the Lion, Bear, Treelo, Stanley, Peanut & Jelly Otter, Olie Polie and Zowie Polie
 Float 12: Snow White and the Seven Dwarfs - Snow White
 Float 13: The Grand Marshal - Chicken Little - Chicken Little / Ratatouille - Rémy / Enchanted - Giselle
 Float 14: Finale - Mickey Mouse, Minnie Mouse, Donald Duck, Goofy, Pluto and guest characters like Alice, Pinocchio, Gepetto, White Rabbit, Chip 'n' Dale and others

Updated cars
 Float: Monsters, Inc. - Sulley and Mike (Update: 2002)
 Float: Lilo & Stitch - Lilo and Stitch (Update: 2002)
 Float: Power Rangers - Consisting of Time Force, Ninja Storm, Wild Force, Dino Thunder, Space Patrol, Delta Mystic Force and Operation Overdrive Power Rangers (Update: 2005)
 Float: Cars - Lightning McQueen and Mater (Update: 2006)

Pre-Parade Cars
With the release of new films, both in theaters and home video, the parade has had several pre-parade promotional units that have not been permanent additions. Those "Guest stars" include: Enchanted, Ratatouille and Chicken Little.

Former cars
The vehicles and floats themed to Atlantis: The Lost Empire and Hercules were removed during the parade's time at Disney's Hollywood Studios.

Walt Disney Studios Park
This parade replaced the Disney Cinema Parade and High School Musical: The Party Show at Walt Disney Studios Park. This version of the parade was also 25 minutes long, with a show-stop on stage at "Place des Stars."

Regular cars
The following eleven cars were at the Walt Disney Studios Park parade from the premiere on April 4, 2009. The parade route began and ended at the backstage gate next to Animagique. The parade had an update on April 2, 2010, with the twelve floats. By 2012, the show's stop at "Place des Stars" had been cut, with the floats simply driving through the studios as a normal parade.

2014 version
 Float 1: Stars 'n' Cars - Mickey and Minnie
 Float 2: The Little Mermaid - Ariel
 Float 3: Aladdin - Aladdin and Jasmine
 Float 4: Mulan - Mulan and Mushu 
 Float 5: Mary Poppins - Mary Poppins and Bert
 Float 6: Lilo & Stitch - Lilo and Stitch
 Float 7: Toy Story - Woody and Jessie
 Float 8: Ratatouille - Rémy and Emile
 Float 9: Disney Villains - Cruella, Gaston and Evil Queen
 Float 10: Stars 'n' Cars - Donald and Daisy

Former Cars
Snow White and the Seven Dwarfs (2009-unknown)
Monsters, Inc. (2009-2013)

References 

Former Walt Disney Parks and Resorts attractions
Walt Disney Parks and Resorts parades
2001 establishments in Florida
2008 disestablishments in Florida
2009 establishments in France
2014 disestablishments in France